Thomas Joseph O'Brien (April 30, 1878 – April 14, 1964) of Chicago was a  U.S. Representative from Illinois, 1933–39, 1943–64, and as Cook County Sheriff from 1938 through 1942. He was of the Democratic Party. He became the "Dean" of Chicago delegates and played a role in the early career of Dan Rostenkowski.

O'Brien died in office of a stroke on April 14, 1964, and was buried at Queen of Heaven Cemetery in Hillside, Illinois.

The T.J. O'Brien Lock and Dam approximately 7 miles from Lake Michigan on the Calumet River in Chicago at the head of the Illinois Waterway is named after Congressman O'Brien.

See also 
 List of United States Congress members who died in office (1950–99)

References 

Politicians from Chicago
1878 births
1964 deaths
Democratic Party members of the United States House of Representatives from Illinois
Sheriffs of Cook County, Illinois